Pseudopimelodus is a genus of catfishes (order Siluriformes) of the family Pseudopimelodidae.

Species
There are currently five recognized species in this genus:
 Pseudopimelodus bufonius (Valenciennes, 1840)
 Pseudopimelodus charus (Valenciennes, 1840)
 Pseudopimelodus mangurus (Valenciennes, 1835)
 Pseudopimelodus pulcher (Boulenger, 1887)
 Pseudopimelodus schultzi (Dahl, 1955)

Distribution
Pseudopimelodus species are distributed throughout South America. P. bufonius is found in rivers of northeastern South America from Lake Maracaibo to eastern Brazil. P. charus originates from the São Francisco River basin. P. mangurus inhabits the Uruguay, Paraná, Paraguay and Río de la Plata basins. P. pulcher is distributed in the Upper Amazon River basin. P. schultzi originates from the Magdalena River basin.

Description
P. pulcher is the smallest species, reaching about 9 centimetres (3.5 in) SL. P. bufonius reaches a length of 25 cm (9.6 in) SL. P. charus and P. schultzi grow to about 20 cm (7.9 in) SL. P. mangurus has a maximum size of about 35 cm (14 in) SL.

References

Pseudopimelodidae
Fish of South America
Fish of the Amazon basin
Taxa named by Pieter Bleeker
Catfish genera
Freshwater fish genera